The 1838–39 United States Senate elections were held on various dates in various states. As these U.S. Senate elections were prior to the ratification of the Seventeenth Amendment in 1913, senators were chosen by state legislatures. Senators were elected over a wide range of time throughout 1838 and 1839, and a seat may have been filled months late or remained vacant due to legislative deadlock. In these elections, terms were up for the senators in Class 1.

The Democratic Party lost seven seats, but still retained a majority.

Results summary 
Senate party division, 26th Congress (1839–1841)

 Majority party: Democratic (28–29)
 Minority party: Whig (19–23)
 Total seats: 52

Change in composition

Before the elections 
After the January 4, 1838 special election in Maryland.

Result of the elections

Beginning of the next term

Race summaries

Special elections during the 25th Congress 
In these special elections, the winners were seated during 1838 or before March 4, 1839; ordered by election date.

Races leading to the 26th Congress 
In these regular elections, the winners were elected for the term beginning March 4, 1839; ordered by state.

All of the elections involved the Class 1 seats.

Special election during the 26th Congress 
In this special election, the winner was seated in 1839 after March 4.

Connecticut

Delaware

Indiana

Maine

Maryland

Maryland (special) 

William Duhurst Merrick won election over to fill the seat vacated by Joseph Kent by an unknown margin of votes, for the Class 1 seat.

Maryland (regular) 

William Duhurst Merrick won election to a full term by an unknown margin of votes, for the Class 1 seat.

Massachusetts

Michigan

Mississippi

Mississippi (regular)

Mississippi (special)

Missouri

New Jersey

New York 

The New York election was held February 5, 1839 by the New York State Legislature. Nathaniel P. Tallmadge had been elected as a Jacksonian Democratic in 1833 to this seat, and his term would expire on March 3, 1839.

On February 4, 1839, the State Legislature elected on joint ballot Spencer, Cooke, Hall and Haight to the offices they were nominated for, but on the next day they could not agree on a U.S. Senator.

The Assembly nominated Nathaniel P. Tallmadge "by the votes of all the Whig members." (see Hammond, page 512)

Although the Democratic State Senate majority did not object to be outvoted on joint ballot for the election of Whigs to State offices, they rejected the idea of electing a renegade Democratic to the U.S. Senate, and took refuge to the only means to defeat Tallmadge: They did not nominate anybody, following the precedents of 1819–1820 and 1825–1826, so that a joint ballot could not be held. On the first ballot, Tallmadge received 13 votes out of 31 cast, all Whigs. The Democratic vote was scattered among many men, nobody receiving more than 2. Four more ballots were held with a similar result. On the sixth ballot, all Whigs and two Democrats voted for Samuel Beardsley, who received 16 votes, one short of the necessary number for a nomination. The Democrats then abandoned further balloting, fearing that the Whigs would vote for anybody who received by chance three Democratic votes, just to force any nomination, thus enabling the Legislature to proceed to the joint ballot.

No further action was taken by this Legislature, and the seat became vacant on March 4, 1839. Tallmadge would later be elected in 1840.

Ohio

Pennsylvania

Rhode Island

Tennessee 

There were three elections to the same seat due to the July 4, 1838 resignation of Democrat Felix Grundy to become U.S. Attorney General.

Tennessee (special, 1838) 

Whig Ephraim H. Foster was elected September 17, 1838 to finish the term.

Tennessee (regular) 

Foster was also elected to the next term, but Foster declined the seat, refusing to take the Tennessee General Assembly's instructions on how to vote, so he left office March 3, 1839 and the seat was vacant when the term began.

Tennessee (special, 1839) 

The legislature then elected Grundy back to the seat November 19, 1839, but he died a year later.

Vermont

Virginia

See also 
 1838 United States elections
 1838–39 United States House of Representatives elections
 25th United States Congress
 26th United States Congress

Notes

References

Sources 
 Party Division in the Senate, 1789–Present, via Senate.gov